Ben Speight is an Australian rules footballer who played for  in the Australian Football League.  He was drafted with the 40th selection in the 2009 Rookie draft and was elevated to their senior list at the end of the 2010 season.

Ben Speight was delisted from North Melbourne at the end of the 2012 season after failing to play a senior match in 2012

References

External links

Living people
1990 births
North Melbourne Football Club players
Norwood Football Club players
Werribee Football Club players
Australian rules footballers from South Australia